Maruschka Detmers (born 16 December 1962, Schoonebeek) is a Dutch actress. She moved to France as a teenager after finishing school, where she captured the attention of director Jean-Luc Godard.  In 1983, she made her dramatic debut under Godard's direction in Prénom Carmen.  Other noteworthy films include Hanna's War (1988) and The Mambo Kings (1992), but she is best known for her role in  Devil in the Flesh (1986).

Family 
Detmers is the mother of actress Jade Fortineau (born 1991) by her relationship with French actor Thierry Fortineau.

Filmography 
 First Name: Carmen (1983)
 Le Faucon (1983)
 La Pirate (1984)
 La vengeance du serpent à plumes (1984)
 Via Mala (1985, mini TV series)
 Lime Street (1985, TV series)
 Il diavolo in corpo (1986)
 Come sono buoni i bianchi (1988)
 Hanna's War (1988)
  (1989)
 Comédie d'été (1989)
 Le Brasier (1991)
 Armen and Bullik (1992, TV)
 The Mambo Kings (1992)
 Elles n'oublient jamais (1994)
 The Shooter (1995)
 Méfie-toi de l'eau qui dort (1996)
 Comme des rois (1997)
 Rewind (1998)
  (1998, TV)
  (1999)
  (1998, TV)
 Pour l'amour du ciel (2000)
 Te quiero (2001)
 Zugvögel der Liebe (2001, TV)
 Mère, fille: mode d'emploi (2002, TV)
 Jean Moulin, une affaire française (2003, TV)
 Capitaine Lawrence (2003, TV)
 Mata Hari, la vraie histoire (2003, TV)
 Mon fils cet inconnu (2004, TV)
 Le Père Goriot (2004, TV)
 Disparition (2005, TV)
 Nos 18 ans (2008)
 Robert Zimmermann wundert sich über die Liebe (2008)
 Ventoux (2015)

References

External links 
 

1962 births
Living people
People from Emmen, Netherlands
Dutch film actresses
Dutch television actresses
Cours Florent alumni
Dutch emigrants to France
20th-century Dutch actresses